Catherine Sidony McGuinness,  (born 1959), is a politician and public speaker for the City of London Corporation, who served as Chair of the Policy and Resources Committee, the Corporation of London's de facto political leader, from 2017 to 2022.

Family
The daughter of two academics, the philosopher Brian McGuinness and the music historian Rosamond McGuinness  née Cohan, her brother, Paddy McGuinness, served as Deputy National Security Adviser for Intelligence, Security, and Resilience at the Cabinet Office, 2014 to 2018.

In 1988 she married John Gilbert, chairman of the Cripplegate Foundation and former Liberal Democrat councillor for Islington (2006–2014).

Career

After reading PPE at St Anne's College, Oxford, McGuinness qualified as a solicitor. She has represented Castle Baynard Ward on the Common Council since 1997. In May 2017 she took over from Sir Mark Boleat as Chairman of the Policy and Resources Committee of the City of London Corporation, having previously served as Deputy Chairman. 

A Trustee of Centre for London, McGuinness is also a Court Assistant to the Musicians' Company and a member of the livery of the Educators' and Solicitors' companies.

She was appointed CBE in the 2023 New Year Honours.

See also
 Court of Common Council

References

1959 births
Living people
Alumni of St Anne's College, Oxford
Women councillors in England
Councilmen of the City of London
Liberal Democrats (UK) councillors
Fellows of King's College London
Commanders of the Order of the British Empire